Outta My Head is the third single from Daughtry, the song is featured on their third studio album Break the Spell. It was released as a single on March 13, 2012.

Music video
The music video was directed by Shane Drake and premiered on VEVO on April 12, 2012. It also stars Kelly Hu. The video begins with a montage of what happens in the video. The next scenes shows Chris sitting at a restaurant patio and notices a girl sitting alone across from him. The girl leaves all of a sudden and Chris starts to follow her. Most of the video shows Chris trying to catch up with her. He eventually catches up to her and gives her a cell phone. There are flashbacks scenes showing that the girl left her cell phone at the restaurant and he was just trying to give it back to her. After returning, her phone it is revealed that the girl had purposely left her phone at the restaurant for someone else to pick up. She is picked up in a black van, hinting that she may be some sort of criminal/spy. The last scene of the video shows that it was all a daydream. Chris sees the same woman leave the restaurant. At first he decides to follow her, but sees that she left her phone behind. He changes his mind and smiles at the camera.

Live performances
Daughtry debuted the song on American Idol on March. On April 30 the band performed the single on Live! with Kelly.

Chart positions

References

Daughtry (band) songs
2012 singles
Songs written by Chris Daughtry
Songs written by Marti Frederiksen
Music videos directed by Shane Drake
Song recordings produced by Howard Benson
2011 songs
RCA Records singles